Alberto Jesús Garza (born 6 June 1985) is a Mexican former professional boxer who competed from 2003 to 2014. He challenged for the WBA featherweight title in 2013.

Professional career
In April 2009, Garza knocked out Genaro Camargo and won the WBC Continental Americas featherweight title.

On 20 November 2010, Garza upset an undefeated champion, Justin Savi to win the WBC Silver Featherweight title.

References

External links
 

Living people
1985 births
Mexican male boxers
Featherweight boxers
Boxers from Mexico City